The PP-19 Vityaz (also known as the PP-19-01 “Vityaz-SN”) is a 9×19mm Parabellum submachine gun developed in 2004 by Russian small arms manufacturer Izhmash. It is based on the AK-74 and offers a high degree of parts commonality with the AK-74. The gun is directly developed from the PP-19 Bizon. "Vityaz" (витязь) is Russian for "knight".

Design details

The PP-19 Vityaz is a selective fire submachine gun that uses a simple closed bolt, straight blowback method of operation. As such, it has no gas system and the internal components have been modified accordingly. The bolt carrier with integral charging handle is similar to AK-family, however the piston rod and rotary bolt were removed and a weight on the bolt extends into the previous gas tube. The return spring and guide rod are almost identical to those of the AK-family.

The PP-19 Vityaz has a four-groove barrel with a 240 mm (1:9 in) right-hand rifling pitch. It is chambered for the 9×19mm Parabellum pistol cartridge and will also fire the new high-pressure armour-piercing 7N31 round that can penetrate soft body armour. The gun is fed from a 30-round box magazine and comes with a fastening device that joins two magazines together. Its muzzle brake has three small rectangular ports on each side that serve to reduce muzzle rise, however their main purpose is to protect the muzzle from damage. It can be equipped with a detachable sound suppressor.

The PP-19 Vityaz shares the same trigger and safety mechanisms as the AK-74 rifle. The selector lever is placed on the right side of the receiver, above the trigger, and has three settings: the uppermost "safe" setting disables the trigger and physically blocks the charging handle; the middle position (marked "АВ") enables fully automatic fire and the lowest position ("ОД") activates the semi-automatic function of the trigger. It utilises the AKS-74 shoulder stock, which folds to the left side of the receiver. The pistol grip is identical to the grip of the AK-100 series and is made of a black fiberglass-reinforced polyamide 6. The handguard has attachment points for laser target designator, tactical flashlight and fore grip.

The PP-19 Vityaz is provided with two types of rail system for mounting various optical or collimator sights. A Picatinny rail on top of the receiver or a dove-tail side rail, and it also has the standard AK-type front and rear sights.

Variants

Vityaz 
The original version of the submachine gun with a standard side rail and no railed dust cover.

Vityaz-SN 
The Vityaz-SN removed the side rail and added the railed dust cover.

PPK-20 
PPK-20 is a further modernization of the PP-19 Vityaz, developed and manufactured by Kalashnikov Concern. The PPK-20 uses the AK-19 stock as well as being issued with AK-9 style handguards and a new suppressor. It is being exported.

Saiga-9 
The Saiga-9 is a semi-automatic pistol-caliber carbine version of the PP-19 Vityaz with 345 mm barrel sold on the Russian civilian market by Kalashnikov.

KP/KR-9
In the United States, Kalashnikov USA (not associated with the Kalashnikov Concern) manufactures an  barrel clone called the KP-9, and a  barrel clone called the KR-9.

Users

 : Used by Namibian Marines.
 : In 2005, it was adopted by the Interior Ministry. Used by various Spetsnaz units of the Interior Ministry, the Federal Security Service and the Federal Guard Service. The 9mm PPK-20 variant with improved ergonomics and ammunition, increased reliability and supplemented with a silencer completed state trials and approved for serial production in July 2020. The Russian Aerospace Forces decided to include the PPK-20 submachine gun in the survival kit for military pilots.
 : Used by police forces.

Gallery

See also
Heckler & Koch MP5
Colt 9mm SMG
Scorpion Evo
FAMAE SAF
Norinco Type 79
RATMIL M96
Zastava Master FLG

References

Submachine guns of Russia
9mm Parabellum submachine guns
Kalashnikov derivatives
Kalashnikov Concern products
Military equipment introduced in the 2000s